Lewis Tower, Jersey (aka Lewiss Tower), is a Martello tower that the British erected in 1835 in St Ouen's Bay. The tower was named after Colonel Griffith Lewis, who commanded the Royal Engineers in Jersey from December 1830 to January 1836.

History 
The location was of some military significance. On 1 May 1779, the Rector of St Ouen, le Sire du Parcq, brought the parish field guns to a favourable spot to help repulse the Franco-Dutch Invasion of Jersey. In 1787 the British placed a battery of three 24-pounder guns on the spot. In 1835, the Martello tower was built there.

Lewis Tower has an elliptical footprint, with the tower's wall being thicker on the seaward side. It has three levels with a central pillar and a circular spiral staircase between the floors. It is 33 feet in height and has a diameter of 39 feet. It was armed with a single 24-pounder gun. It is thus smaller and more lightly armed than the nearby Kempt Tower. Four years after Lewis Tower's completion, it received a coat of stucco or cement to reduce the damp.

During the German occupation of the Channel Islands, the Germans built a large bunker next to Lewis Tower. The bunker today houses the Channel Islands Military Museum. The Germans also built a concrete extension at the tower's base that housed a searchlight.

Today, the tower is available as self-catering accommodation under a programme that Jersey Heritage administers for the States of Jersey Towers and Forts project.

Citations

References
 
 
 

World War II sites in the Channel Islands
Buildings and structures in Saint Ouen, Jersey
Museums in Jersey
Coastal artillery
Fortifications in Jersey
History of Jersey
World War II sites of Nazi Germany
Military history of the Channel Islands during World War II
Jersey
Towers in Jersey
Towers completed in 1835
Martello towers